Ypsolopha fractella is a moth of the family Ypsolophidae. It is known from Spain and Tunisia.

The wingspan is 14.5–17 mm.

The larvae feed on Ephedra altissima.

References

External links
lepiforum.de

Ypsolophidae
Moths of Europe
Moths of Africa